Wirral West is a constituency represented in the House of Commons of the UK Parliament by Margaret Greenwood of the Labour Party since 2015.

Constituency profile
The constituency is one of four covering the Metropolitan Borough of Wirral. It includes Hoylake, West Kirby, Woodchurch and the north edge of Heswall. This is one of the more affluent areas within Merseyside, reflected in higher house prices and wages than the wider North West region.

History 
Wirral West was created in 1983 from the northern part of the former Wirral constituency, which had traditionally elected Conservative MPs. Selwyn Lloyd was the predecessor constituency's MP from 1945 to 1976, serving as Foreign Secretary during the Eden ministry, Chancellor of the Exchequer during the Macmillan ministry and becoming Speaker of the Commons in 1971. Raised to the peerage in 1976, Lloyd resigned his seat and the ensuing by-election was won by David Hunt, who became the first MP for Wirral West in 1983. Hunt was a Cabinet member under Margaret Thatcher and John Major, serving as Secretary of State for Employment and twice as Secretary of State for Wales.

Hunt held the seat until 1997, when he lost to barrister Stephen Hesford of the Labour Party, but remained in Parliament as a member of the House of Lords. Hesford increased his majority in 2001 and narrowly retained the seat in 2005, despite a challenge at the latter election from former TV presenter and Conservative Esther McVey. On 22 January 2010, he announced his intention to step down at the next general election for family reasons.

New boundary changes implemented, McVey stood again and won the seat for the Conservatives at the 2010 general election, serving in the coalition government as a Work and Pensions minister during her tenure. If implemented in 2005, the 2010 boundary changes would have seen the Conservatives win the seat by 569 votes.

Wirral West had been described as a bellwether since its establishment, but bucked the trend at the 2015 general election when Labour's Margaret Greenwood narrowly defeated McVey, despite the Conservatives winning a parliamentary majority. Like the nearby City of Chester, it was one of the few Conservative-held marginals outside of London to be gained by Labour, who benefited from the constituency's collapse in Liberal Democrat support.

Sixth on the Conservative target list in 2017, Greenwood was comfortably re-elected to Wirral West with the highest winning vote share since the seat was first up for election in 1983. She was promoted to Jeremy Corbyn's shadow cabinet as the Shadow Work and Pensions Secretary in 2018, shadowing McVey who had returned to Parliament as the MP for Tatton. Greenwood was re-elected with a reduced vote share in 2019, and departed from the shadow cabinet upon Keir Starmer's election as Labour leader.

Boundaries 	

1983–2010: Metropolitan Borough of Wirral wards of Hoylake, Prenton, Royden, Thurstaston, and Upton.

2010–present: Metropolitan Borough of Wirral wards of Greasby, Frankby and Irby, Hoylake and Meols, Pensby and Thingwall, Upton, and West Kirby and Thurstaston.

In the 2005 Boundary Commission report, Wirral West lost part of the Prenton ward to the Birkenhead constituency, and gained part of Barnston from Wirral South.

Members of Parliament

Elections

Elections in the 1980s

Elections in the 1990s

Elections in the 2000s

Elections in the 2010s

See also 
 List of parliamentary constituencies in Merseyside

References

Parliamentary constituencies in North West England
Constituencies of the Parliament of the United Kingdom established in 1983
Politics of the Metropolitan Borough of Wirral